Robert H. "Bob" Bettisworth (August 23, 1926 – February 13, 2015) was an American businessman and politician.

Born in Coffeyville, Kansas, Bettisworth went to Fairbanks, Alaska Territory, in 1948, to look for gold. Later he started a masonry business and was also in the grocery and real estate businesses. From 1965 to 1976, Bettisworth served in the Fairbanks-North Star Borough Assembly and was presiding officer of the borough assembly. From 1979 to 1985, Bettisworth served in the Alaska House of Representatives. He died in Mesa, Arizona.

Notes

External links
 Robert Bettisworth at 100 Years of Alaska's Legislature

1926 births
2015 deaths
American construction businesspeople
American real estate businesspeople
Businesspeople from Fairbanks, Alaska
Fairbanks North Star Borough Assembly members
Republican Party members of the Alaska House of Representatives
People from Coffeyville, Kansas
Politicians from Fairbanks, Alaska
20th-century American businesspeople